is a Japanese animated television series based on the d'Artagnan Romances written by Alexandre Dumas, that ran from October 1987 to February 1989.

A feature film sequel, was released in March 1989.

Plot
D'Artagnan leaves his hometown in the province of Gascony for Paris, in order to join the King's Musketeers or the Guards of the Cardinal. At his arrival, he gets into an argument with Athos, Porthos and Aramis and provokes them into a sword-fight. While fighting, they are interrupted by the Guards of the Cardinal, who are enforcing the King's decree banning duels. Afterwards, d'Artagnan and the others become friends and adopt the motto "All for one, and one for all".

Cast
D'Artagnan: Tatsuya Matsuda
Constance Bonacieux: Noriko Hidaka
Jean: Mayumi Tanaka
Athos: Akira Kamiya
Aramis: Eiko Yamada
Porthos: Masamichi Satō
Louis XIII: Hideyuki Tanaka
Queen Anne: Mari Okamoto
Richelieu: Nobuo Tanaka
Tréville: Tesshō Genda
Rochefort: Shigeru Chiba
Jacques: Tomomichi Nishimura
Milady: Fumi Hirano
Coby: Naoki Tatsuta
Narration: Toshiko Sawada

References

External links

 

1987 anime television series debuts
1989 anime OVAs
1989 Japanese television series endings
Cultural depictions of Cardinal Richelieu
Cultural depictions of Louis XIII
Gallop (studio)
NHK original programming
Television shows based on The Three Musketeers
Television series set in the 17th century
Television shows set in France
Cross-dressing in anime and manga
Adventure anime and manga
Action anime and manga
Romance anime and manga
Historical anime and manga